Song Zhaosu (March 1941 – 25 July 2022) was a Chinese politician.

Early life and education
He was born in Nanyang, Henan. He graduated from Zhengzhou University in 1964 and a year later joined the Chinese Communist Party.

Career
Song Zhaosu had started his political career as the head of the Organization Department of Zhoukou District Committee in Zhoukou, Henan province. Later on, he served as deputy secretary of the Shangshui County Committee and then was its magistrate and secretary of Taikang County. Following that he became a secretary of both Zhoukou and Xuchang districts as well as of Standing Committee of the National People's Congress and Political and Legal Committee of the Henan Provincial Party Committee. In 1988 he became a member of the Standing Committee and then was appointed vice-governor of his home province. Zhaosu was then appointed a governor and served there from 1999 to 2001 and from that year till 2003 was a Communist Party Committee Secretary of Gansu. On 22 April 2002, he was elected as the secretary of the provincial party committee at the 10th meeting of the CCP Gansu Provincial Committee. From January 2003 to August of the same year, he served as the director of the Standing Committee of the Gansu Provincial People's Congress. In August 2003, he served as deputy director of the 10th People's Congress Environment and Resources Protection Committee.

He also served as an alternate member of the 15th Central Committee of the Chinese Communist Party and was a member of its 16th Central Committee. In March 2005, he was elected as a member of the Standing Committee of the National People's Congress in the Third Session of the 10th National People's Congress.

Death
On 25 July 2022, he died from an illness in Shanghai, at the age of 81.

References

External links
Song Zhaosu on the People's Daily

1941 births
2022 deaths
People from Nanyang, Henan
Zhengzhou University alumni
Vice-governors of Henan
Governors of Gansu
People's Republic of China politicians from Henan
Chinese Communist Party politicians from Henan
Members of the Standing Committee of the 10th National People's Congress
Alternate members of the 15th Central Committee of the Chinese Communist Party
Members of the 16th Central Committee of the Chinese Communist Party